Lieblingshof is a village and a former municipality in the district of Rostock, in Mecklenburg-Vorpommern, Germany. Since 7 June 2009, it is part of the municipality Dummerstorf. Prior to this, it was within the Warnow-Ost Amt.

Villages in Mecklenburg-Western Pomerania